Donald H. Haider is an American business professor and politician. He has long been a business professor at Northwestern University's Kellogg School of Management. He ran in 1987 as a Republican nominee for mayor of Chicago.

Early life and education
Haider was born in either 1944 or 1945.
Haider was raised in the northern suburbs of Chicago.

He graduated Stanford University in 1964 with a Bachelor of Arts. He graduated Columbia University in 1967 with a Master of Arts. He graduated from Columbia again in 1973 with a PhD in political science.

Career
Haider has served on the corporate boards of Asset Acceptance Capital Corp, Continental Waste Industries, Covenant Mutual Insurance, Evanston National Bank, Fender Musical Instruments, InterAccess, LaSalle National Bank Corp, National Can, Talman Home Savings, and Westchester Insurance.

Haider has been considered a property finance expert.

In March 2016, he was elected a Fellow of the Business Excellence Institute.

Professorial career
Haider first taught at Columbia University.

In 1973, Haider left Columbia University and began working as a business professor at Northwestern University's Kellogg School of Management. For most of the next four decades, he would teach there as a professor of strategy.

Haider served as head of the school's public management program.

He has served as director of the Kellogg School Center for Nonprofit Management until 2016. He had played a part in establishing it.

He retired from teaching full-time in late 2016. He was made an Emeritus Professor in 2017.

Political career
Haider was a congressional fellow from 1967 to 1968. He worked in the office of United States senator Ted Kennedy.

After working as a congressional fellow, Haider worked at a guest scholar at the Brookings Institution.

Haider was a White House fellow from 1976 to 1977. He is the only academic to serve both as a White House fellow and congressional fellow.

During the presidencies of Gerald Ford and Jimmy Carter, he worked an assistant to three different directors of the Office of Management and Budget. In this role, he was assigned to refinance New York City, which was facing a potential bankruptcy amid a financial crisis in the city.

Haider had worked as an advisor to Richard J. Daley during his mayoralty. Haider also worked as the Chicago city budget director (chief financial officer for the City of Chicago) under Jane Byrne from 1979 until 1980.

Haider served as deputy assistant secretary of the United States Treasury. 

Haider has also served as vice chairman of the Chicago School Finance Authority for fifteen years, during which time he helped refinance the schools. 

Haider, in 2008, served on the president of the Cook County Board of Commissioners' task force on property tax classification.

Haider served as an alternate delegate to the 2012 Republican National Convention, pledged to Mitt Romney.

1987 Chicago mayoral campaign

In 1987, Haider won the Republican mayoral primary, making him the party's nominee for mayor. Haider had, previous to running for the Republican Party's mayoral nomination, been a Democrat. The fifth overall mayoral candidate to be a resident of Edgewater, Haider would have been the third mayor from Edgewater if he were elected (and the first since Martin H. Kennelly). Ahead of the primary, Haider was endorsed by the city's Republican Party organization on December 4, 1986. He had narrowly defeated 1983 nominee Bernard Epton for the endorsement. The search committee to find a candidate for the Republican Party to endorse had been chaired by Dan K. Webb. After receiving the party's endorsement on December 2, 1985, he formally launched his campaign on December 3. Despite the party organization having already endorsing Haider, both Epton and Democratic state senator Jeremiah E. Joyce indicated their intentions to challenge Haider in the Republican primary. Neither ultimately ran. Instead, he was challenged by Kenneth Hurst, Chester Hornowski, and Ray Wardingley. Haider won the party's nomination in the Republican primary.

His candidacy was seen as a long shot. However, Republican leaders initially hoped that the 1986 election of Republican James O'Grady as Cook County sheriff was a sign that a Republican might be able to perform well in the 1989 mayoral election. They hoped that a strong performance by Haider would assist the party in getting a Republican affiliated candidate elected Chicago alderman for the first time in twelve years. Republican Party leaders considered him the party's most qualified mayoral candidate they had put forth in a long while. However, a March 1987 poll showed that very few of those that had voted for 1983 Republican nominee Bernard Epton in the last election were intending to vote for Haider the 1987 election. Part of this was attributed to there being two other white challengers against Harold Washington, Edward Vrdolyak and Tom Hynes. He also lagged in fundraising, with those opposed to Washington donating mostly to the other two challengers' campaigns, and with Republican Party members more focused on donating to presidential campaigns, as the race for the 1984 Republican Party presidential primaries had already begun. His fundraising severely lagged behind the other campaigns. Tom Hynes withdrew from the race just before the general election, but this did not help Haider's performance. 

During the campaign, in a desperate bid for press, Haider rode an elephant (an animal often used to symbolize the Republican Party) down State Street.

In the general election he placed last out of the three candidates in the general election, only garnering 4.3% of the vote.

Nonprofit work
Haider has been on the boards of the Midtown Educational Foundation, Chicago Catholic Charities, and the U.S. Rugby Foundation.

Rugby
Haider has long been involved in the sport of rugby. In 2018, he was inducted into the United States Rugby Hall of Fame. He played rugby while at Stanford University, and continued playing and coaching rugby throughout his adulthood.

Awards
Martha Derthick 2012 Best Book Award on federalism and intergovernmental relations (for "When Governments Come to Washington")
2018 United States Rugby Hall of Fame inductee
Chicago Midtown Education Foundation’s "Reach for Excellence Award" (with Jean Haider)
Business Excellence Hall of Fame inductee in 2017

Works authored
Haider has authored around 50 scholarly articles and in excess of 100 newspaper columns. He has also co-authored a multitude books. Many of his books were co-authored with  Philip Kotler and Irving J. Rein.

Select articles
 
 
 
 
 
 
Haider, Donald. (May 9, 1985). "CHICAGO`S POST-DALEY DRIFT". Chicago Tribune
 
 
 
 
 
 
 
 
 
 
 
 
 

Books
 
  (with Philip Kotler, Irving Reinn)
  (with Christer Asplund, Philip Kotler, Irving Reinn)
  (with Michael Allen Hamlin, Philip Kotler, Irving Rein)
  (with David Gertner, Philip Kotler, Irving Rein)

References

Illinois Republicans
Illinois Democrats
Kellogg School of Management faculty
Writers from Illinois
Stanford University alumni
Columbia Graduate School of Arts and Sciences alumni
1940s births
Living people
Year of birth uncertain